Walter Joseph Karbo (August 14, 1915 – March 23, 1993) was an American professional wrestling promoter and co-founder of the American Wrestling Association with Verne Gagne. A longtime promoter in the Minneapolis-area, Karbo was a close associate of Tony Stecher and attended the first meeting of the National Wrestling Alliance held by Stecher in 1948.

He was born and raised in northeast Minneapolis and graduated from De La Salle High school in 1934. He went to work as an assistant to Minneapolis boxing and wrestling promoter Tony Stecher in the 1930s. He eventually became a referee for wrestling matches and then evolved into a promoter.

In 1952, Tony Stecher sold a one-third interest in the Minneapolis Boxing and Wrestling club to Wally Karbo and his son Dennis Stecher. On October 9, 1954, Tony Stecher died and control of the promotion passed to Karbo and Dennis Stecher. In 1959, Dennis Stecher sold his majority stake in the Minneapolis Boxing and Wrestling club to Karbo and Gagne. They became co-owners of the promotion from that point onward.

Breaking away from the National Wrestling Alliance, he and Gagne established the AWA in 1960 and together operated the promotion for over thirty years. He would also appear as an on-air personality hosting the AWA's Saturday morning television show All-Star Wrestling before Karbo sold his interests to Gagne in 1985. Although retiring soon after, he did remain in professional wrestling, most notably appearing as the commissioner of the Ladies Pro Wrestling Association before his death from a heart attack on March 23, 1993.

Awards and accomplishments
Professional Wrestling Hall of Fame and Museum
Class of 2019

References

External links 

1915 births
1993 deaths
20th-century American businesspeople
American Wrestling Association
Professional wrestling announcers
Professional Wrestling Hall of Fame and Museum
Professional wrestling promoters
Professional wrestling trainers
Sportspeople from Minneapolis